Fishburg is an extinct town in Montgomery County, in the U.S. state of Ohio. The exact location of the town is unknown to the GNIS.

History
Fishburg developed around a toll gate on the State Route 202 (Old Troy Pike). A post office called Fishburgh was established in 1858, and closed in 1859.  It lay within Wayne Township, which incorporated as the city of Huber Heights in 1981.

References

Geography of Montgomery County, Ohio
Ghost towns in Ohio